The Bethlehem Branch could refer to following:

 the former main line of the North Pennsylvania Railroad between Bethlehem and Philadelphia
 the Bethlehem Line, a former SEPTA rail service which operated over the above
 the former main line of the Lehigh and Lackawanna Railroad between Bethlehem and Wind Gap